Denys Clerval (11 September 1934 in Paris – 9 June 2016) was a French cinematographer.

Selected filmography 
 Short films
 1961: 10 juin 1944 by Maurice Cohen (Prix Jean-Vigo 1962)
 1961: Actua-Tilt by Jean Herman
 1961: La Quille by Jean Herman (Prix du jury at the Venice Film Festival)
 1962: Twist Parade by Jean Herman (Award for best documentary film at the 1963 International Short Film Festival Oberhausen)
 1963: La Meule by René Allio
 1965: Les Autres by Maurice Cohen
 1964: La Belle Époque by Claude Guillemot
 1964: De Paris à la Provence by Claude Guillemot
 1964: La Cinémathèque française by Jean Herman
 1967: Le Temps redonné by Henri Fabiani and Jean-Louis Levi-Alvarès
 1967: Baudelaire est mort en été by François Weyergans
 Moyen métrage
 1962: Le Chemin de la mauvaise route by Jean Herman
 Feature films
 1965: The Shameless Old Lady by René Allio
 1967: The Wall by Serge Roullet
 1968: La Trêve by Claude Guillemot
 1968: Stolen Kisses by François Truffaut
 1969: Mississippi Mermaid by François Truffaut
 1970: Les Camisards by René Allio
 1973: Rude Journée pour la reine by René Allio
 1981: Malevil by Christian de Chalonge (2nd team)
 1983: Erendira by Ruy Guerra
 1987: Ubac by Jean-Pierre Grasset
 1987: La Brute by Claude Guillemot
 1989: Natalia de 
 1991: The Annunciation of Marie by Alain Cuny
 1994: Daisy et Mona by Claude d'Anna
 Télévision
 1969: Jean-Roch Coignet, mini série by Claude-Jean Bonnardot
 1981: La Double Vie de Théophraste Longuet, mini series by Yannick Andréi
 1993: La Fortune de Gaspard, telefilm by Gérard Blain

References

External links 
 Denys Clerval on AFC
 Denys Clerval on Allo Ciné
 Denys Clerval on Unifrance
 

French cinematographers
1934 births
Film directors from Paris
2016 deaths